is a Japanese light novel series written by Zappon and illustrated by Yasumo. It began serialization online in October 2017 on the user-generated novel publishing website Shōsetsuka ni Narō. It was later acquired by Kadokawa Shoten, who have published the series since June 2018 under their Kadokawa Sneaker Bunko imprint. 

A manga adaptation with art by Masahiro Ikeno has been serialized in Kadokawa Shoten's shōnen manga magazine Monthly Shōnen Ace since May 2018. Both the light novel and manga are licensed in North America by Yen Press. An anime television series adaptation produced by Wolfsbane and Studio Flad aired from October to December 2021. A second season has been announced.

Synopsis 
In a world whose inhabitants find their destinies dictated by the Divine Blessings they receive upon birth, Gideon Ragnason was a member of the Hero's Party, a powerful group led by his sister Ruti destined to save the world from evil. His Blessing gave him the common ability to survive any terrain, and he proves that additional skills can go beyond the limit. That is, until one day, Ares, the Party's second-in-command, considers him a dead weight to the party members and banishes him from the group. Gideon heeds Ares' words and leaves without telling Ruti.

Hoping to live an easy life on the frontier, Gideon moves to a borderland town and opens an apothecary, changing his name to Red. However, keeping his former status a secret may not be as simple as he thinks, especially when Rit, a beautiful adventurer from his past, shows up and asks to move in with him!

Characters
 / 

Red is an apothecary residing in the town of Zoltan . His real name is Gideon Ragnason, formerly known as a knight and member of The Hero's Party, who was banished from the group for "being a liability". His Divine Blessing is "Guide", which gives him the ability to survive in any terrain and is important for his knowledge of herbs. To be more useful to his party members, he has learned a number of additional skills beyond the limits of his Blessing; in times of need, he proves to be a skilled combatant, tactician, and leader. Reserved and humble, but with a noble heart, he was much beloved by most of his party, and his leaving has caused much resentment against Ares, who facilitated his resignation.He runs his apothecary shop in Zoltan  with his wife, Rit, who is a former adventurer and princess of Loggervia 
 / 

Rit is a B-ranked adventurer and Red's wife, who resides with Red in his home beside the apothecary shop he runs. She is the brash princess of the Duchy of Loggervia, a military power. She actually came to live with Red both to escape a power struggle within her family, and because she has developed a crush on him while they worked together for a time before his retirement. Her Divine Blessing is "Spirit Scout". Her weapons of choice are two miniature shotels, one on each hip in custom scabbards.

Ruti is Red's younger sister, who happens to be the Hero. The Party she leads is the major thorn in the side of The Demon Lord's Army. Her Hero's Blessing bestows her with incredible resistance to physical discomforts; however, it also makes her indifferent to emotional extremes. Due to this, her love for her brother is Ruti's most important anchor, and she misses him terribly after Ares' scheming drove him away. As a result, she begins fighting her Blessing in order to be reunited with Gideon. She eventually develops a new Blessing called "New Truth", which has the ability to control and dominate other Blessings.

Yarandrala is a former comrade of Red's who is still on good terms with him. She is a high elf with the Divine Blessing of "Forest Speaker", which allows her to talk to and control plants. She was the first to leave the Hero's Party in outrage over Ares' scheme driving Red away.

Ares is a mage with the Divine Blessing of "Wise Man". His duty is being the second-in-command of The Hero's Party. He is responsible for banishing Gideon/Red from the party because he is obsessively jealous of Gideon's personal closeness to Ruti. 

Albert is a former comrade of Red's with an attitude who now lives in Zoltan. He has the Divine Blessing of "The Champion", which pushes him into an obsession to succeed. His greatest ambition is to become a member of The Hero's Party.

Gonzu is a half-elf and a close friend of Red's. He is also a carpenter by trade. He lives with his sister and her family very close to Red's house/shop.

Nao is a half-elf and Gonz's sister. She is married to Mido and is Tanta's mother. 

Mido is a human and is married to Nao. He helps his brother-in-law Gonz with his carpentry business.

Nao and Mido's son, Gonz's nephew and is a friend of Red's.

The clerk at Zoltan's Adventurers Guild. 

An adventurer from Loggervia that can use fire magic.

One of the local doctors that do business with Red.

Zoltan's resident furniture shopkeeper and a goblin with the Divine Blessing of a "Craftsman". He has a bit of a beef with Red for haggling with him over the cheapest bed in the shop.

Danan is a member of The Hero's Party, gifted with the Divine Blessings of the "Martial Arts". He knows the reason why Ares banished Gideon from the party.

Theodora is a member of The Hero's Party, gifted with the Divine Blessings of the "Crusader".

Tisse is the newest member and Gideon's replacement in The Hero's Party, gifted with the Divine Blessings of the "Assassin".  She is accompanied by her pet spider Mister Crawly Wawly.

Media

Light novels
Series is written by Zappon and illustrated by Yasumo. It began serialization online in October 2017 on the user-generated novel publishing website Shōsetsuka ni Narō. It was later acquired by Kadokawa Shoten, who have published eleven volumes since June 2018 under their Kadokawa Sneaker Bunko imprint. The light novel series is licensed in North America by Yen Press.

Manga
A manga adaptation with art by Masahiro Ikeno has been serialized in Kadokawa Shoten's shōnen manga magazine Monthly Shōnen Ace since May 2018. It has been collected in nine tankōbon volumes as of July 2022. The Manga series is also licensed in North America by Yen Press.

Anime
An anime television series adaptation was announced on November 17, 2020. The series is animated by Wolfsbane and Studio Flad and directed by Makoto Hoshino, with Megumi Shimizu handling the series' scripts, Ruriko Watanabe designing the characters, and Yukari Hashimoto composing the music. The series marked the first time Ryōta Suzuki had been cast in a leading voice role. It was originally scheduled to premiere in July 2021, but was delayed to October 2021 due to "various circumstances."  It aired from October 6 to December 29, 2021 on AT-X and other channels. Yui Nishio performed the opening theme "Iki o Sū Koko de Sū Ikiteku" (息を吸う ここで吸う 生きてく), while JYOCHO performed the ending theme "Minna Onaji" (みんなおなじ, All the Same). Funimation licensed the series outside of Asia. On October 19, 2021, Funimation announced that the series would receive an English dub, which premiered the following day.

A second season was announced on October 31, 2022.

Episode list

Reception
The light novel series has over 1,000,000 copies in print as of November 2020, when the anime adaptation was announced.

See also
 Farming Life in Another World – Another light novel illustrated by Yasumo

Notes

References

External links
 at Shōsetsuka ni Narō 
 
 
 

2018 Japanese novels
Anime and manga based on light novels
AT-X (TV network) original programming
Crunchyroll anime
Fantasy anime and manga
Kadokawa Dwango franchises
Kadokawa Shoten manga
Kadokawa Sneaker Bunko
Light novels
Light novels first published online
Shōnen manga
Shōsetsuka ni Narō
Slice of life anime and manga
Studio Flad
Upcoming anime television series
Wolfsbane (animation studio)
Yen Press titles